The Apportionment Act of 1911 was an apportionment bill passed by the United States Congress on August 8, 1911. The law initially set the number of members of the United States House of Representatives at 433, effective with the 63rd Congress on March 4, 1913. It also included, in section 2, a provision to add an additional seat for each of the anticipated new states of Arizona and New Mexico (which happened in 1912), bringing the total number of seats to 435.

Previous apportionment
To give effect to the requirements of Article One, Section 2, Clause 3 of the United States Constitution and Section Two of the Fourteenth Amendment that United States representatives be apportioned to the states in proportion to their respective populations, Congress would pass Apportionment Acts following each Census, starting with the Apportionment Act of 1792.

Prior to the Apportionment Act of 1911, the Hamilton/Vinton (largest remainder) method was used in the apportionment of seats since 1850.  In addition to setting the number of U.S. Representatives at 435, the Apportionment Act of 1911 returned to the Webster method of apportionment of U.S. Representatives.

Text

Subsequent apportionment
For the first and only time, Congress failed to pass an apportionment act after the 1920 census.  This left the allocations of the Act of 1911 in place until the 1930 census.  The Reapportionment Act of 1929 established a method for reallocating seats among the states, given population shifts and the maximum of 435 representatives.  A 1941 amendment to the 1929 act made the apportionment process self-executing after each decennial census.  This lifted Congress's responsibility to pass an apportionment act for each census, and ensured that the events surrounding the 1920 census would not happen again.  The number of U.S. Representatives increased temporarily to 437 when Alaska and Hawaii were admitted as states during the 86th Congress (seating one member from each of those states without changing the apportionment of the other seats).  After the 1960 census and the 1962 election, that number went back to 435.

See also
 United States congressional apportionment
 Redistricting

References

External links
 Member FAQ, "What is the size of the House of Representatives and how is it determined?" - Office of the Clerk of the U.S. House of Representatives

1911 in American law
United States federal government administration legislation
62nd United States Congress